St Michael's Church, Flixton, is an Anglican parish church in Flixton, Greater Manchester dedicated to Michael the Archangel. It lies in the parish of Flixton (which originally encompassed the parish of Urmston), in the Anglican Diocese of Manchester (previously in the Diocese of Lichfield for 500 years).

History 
Little is known of the origins of when this site was first used for worship, it is presumed that people have been worshipping here since before the Norman invasion of 1066, however there is little structural evidence of this, however some believe the church to be actually founded in 1198.

The Church of St Michael's is in the Parish of Flixton. Medieval Flixton was one of several parishes which existed in the Hundred of Salford.  The parish encompassed the manors of Urmston and Flixton; the latter is first mentioned between 1189 and 1181 and was granted by the Mascy family of Dunham. There is a place of worship for Wesleyans. Flixton has been recorded as Fluxton, Flaxtown, Flyxton, Flyxeton, and Flixtone, amongst other spellings. It has been suggested that Flixton derives its name from "Fleecetown" because of its 14th-century connection with the woolen industry. Flixton first appears in historical records in 1177 however, making that toponymy seem unlikely. The name is more probably of Scandinavian origin, perhaps deriving from the Viking called Flikke or Flikkr who is credited with bringing Christianity to the area and constructing the original sanctuary end stone wall behind the altar,(however there are differing exact theories to this).

The Anglo-Saxon ton means dwelling place, hence Flikke's ton. The manor of Flixton's boundaries are unclear, although they were perhaps formed by a mixture of natural and man-made features including Carr Ditch, which divided Flixton and Urmston.  St Michael's Church is also first recorded at about the same time.  In keeping with a pattern found in northern and eastern Cheshire and south-eastern Lancashire, the parish comprised isolated farmsteads and a medieval manor house, rather than a village centre. As the population of Flixton grew throughout the 19th and 20th century, a new church St. John's was constructed in the mid 20th century to serve as a "mission-church".

Flixton is in the Church of England Diocese of Manchester and the Roman Catholic Diocese of Salford.  Historically church life has centred around the Grade II* listed 12th-century church, built on raised land close to the centre of Flixton village.  For about 500 years the church was attached to Lichfield Cathedral.  Another Church of England place of worship, St John's Church, can be found on Irlam Road.  Flixton's Catholic Community worships at St Monica's Church on Woodsend Road South.  The parish was founded in 1950 and the church built from 1968 to 1969.

Church building 

The church is in a predominantly Georgian in its architectural-contextual style. In 1888 the tower which now stands was completely rebuilt on the foundations of a previous 18th century one.{
  "type": "FeatureCollection",
  "features": [
    {
      "type": "Feature",
      "properties": {},
      "geometry": {
        "type": "Point",
        "coordinates": [
          -2.381951808929444,
          53.4418705109029
        ]
      }
    }
  ]
}

Interior 
'The present structure retains so little ancient work that little or nothing can be said of the development of the plan. Two fragments of what appear to be 12th-century stones with lozenge ornament are built into the east wall on the outside, but apart from these the oldest work in the building is contained in the chancel, which, in something of its present form, dates from the 15th century. It has been so much rebuilt, however, that little or nothing of the original work remains except in the reconstructed walling, the lower part of which appears to be old or entirely rebuilt of ancient masonry.'-(Farrer and Brownbill, 1911)

St Michael's church tower is home to a ring of eight bells. The bells at St Michael's are still rung every week for church services and the bell ringers practise every Tuesday night.  In 1808 the four bells were recast and four more added. They were recast again in 1938. The tenor bells weighs  and is tuned to F (706.0 Hz).  The bells are still rung today.  And there has been a robed choir in existence at St Michael's since the 1870s.

Churchyard 
The earliest stone dates from 1669, though there are records of burials before that. There are simple verses on many of the flat-stones, e.g. the Fiddler's grave near the vestry door. The verse on the Blacksmith's grave, William Oldfield, east of the vestry, is attributed to the Lancashire poet Tim Bobbin, who was baptised in this church.

Vicar 
The vicar incumbent of the parish is The Reverend Huw Thomas, who replaced the previous vicar, the Reverend Dr. Victoria Johnson (the current Residentiary Canon of Ely Cathedral ) in 2016. There has been a resident curate/ rector in the parish since before the 16th century.

Parish groups 
The parish runs numerous groups for the community to participate in:

 Bell ringers
 The Choir
 The Churchyard gardening team
 Mother's union

Restoration and Development Trust 
There is a paying restoration and development trust at the church, it describes itself as having "... two main purposes. Firstly it is dedicated to maintaining and developing the fabric of the church both inside and out. This remit extends to Church Croft, a property adjacent to St Michaels, purchased by the Parochial Church Council, and where most Parish activities take place. Secondly the Trust contributes to the spiritual growth of the St. Michael."

Gallery

See also 
 Flixton
 Anglican diocese of Manchester
 Urmston
 List of churches in Greater Manchester
 Antependium

References

Bibliography 

 Langton, D. H. (1991) [1898], A History of the Parish of Flixton, Trafford Metropolitan Borough,
 'The parish of Flixton', in A History of the County of Lancaster: Volume 5, ed. William Farrer and J Brownbill (London, 1911), pp. 42–45. 
 The Story of Urmston, Flixton and Davyhulme: A New History of the Three Townships: Michael Billington

External links 

Google Books

Photographic Credits- 
As appreciated to  :

 Dave Newton- St. Michaels Church and graveyard - geograph.org.uk - 1345486.jpg
 Dave Smethurst - St Michaels Flixton Manchester.jpg
 Photos Via: Tom Jeffs @ Parrot of Doom- Rest of Images

Churches in Trafford
Church of England church buildings in Greater Manchester
Grade II* listed churches in Greater Manchester
Anglican Diocese of Manchester